American rapper Lupe Fiasco has released eight studio albums, six mixtapes, seven soundtrack albums, 38 singles (including 10 as a featured artist), and 37 music videos.

Fiasco has made music with a number of hip hop artists including Kanye West ("Touch the Sky"), Snoop Dogg ("Hi-Definition"), Pharrell Williams ("I Gotcha"), Jay-Z ("Pressure"), Double, Joy Denalane and Dan the Automator. He has also made music with musicians outside of the hip hop genre, such as Blake Lewis.

His debut album, Lupe Fiasco's Food & Liquor, was released in 2006. His second album, Lupe Fiasco's The Cool was his first album to be given an RIAA certification, being certified Gold in April 2008 and eventually reaching Platinum status in October 2022. Lupe Fiasco's The Cool has also spurred his first top 10 single, "Superstar". The song was also certified platinum by the RIAA. Both of his first two albums have been met with positive feedback, with several critics labeling his debut as a masterpiece. Some critics have also stated Lupe Fiasco's The Cool as an even greater followup.

His third studio album, Lasers, was released on March 8, 2011, and debuted at number one on the US Billboard 200, making it his first number one album on the chart as well as his highest debut sales, with over 200,000 albums sold the first week. Lasers has also been certified Gold. The lead single for the album, "The Show Goes On" has been his most successful single to date, reaching the top 10, and has been certified 2× Platinum by the RIAA two years after "Superstar". Despite the success Lasers was met with mixed reviews from music critics. In 2012 he released his 4th studio album Food & Liquor II: The Great American Rap Album Pt. 1 and was promoted by four singles including "Battle Scars" which went platinum by the RIAA. The album was met with positive reviews. In 2015 he released his 5th studio album Tetsuo & Youth after being delayed several times. It debuted at number 14 on the charts and was met with critical acclaim from music critics and was ranked in many year end lists.

Studio albums

EPs

Mixtapes

Singles

As lead artist

As featured artist

Promotional singles

Other charted songs

Guest appearances

Production discography

2007
Lupe Fiasco – Lupe Fiasco's The Cool
15. "Hello Goodbye/Uncool"

2007
Kanye West – Can't Tell Me Nothing: The Mixtape
03. "Us Placers" (performed by Child Rebel Soldier)

2013
Kanye West – Yeezus
02. "BLKKK SKKKN HEAD"

2015
Lupe Fiasco – Tetsuo & Youth
04. "Dots & Lines"

Soundtracks

Video games

Film

Music videos

As lead artist

As featured artist

Notes 

A  "Hip-Hop Saved My Life" did not enter the Hot R&B/Hip-Hop Songs chart, but peaked at number 20 on the Bubbling Under R&B/Hip-Hop Singles chart, which acts as a 25-song extension to the Hot R&B/Hip-Hop Songs chart.
B  "Bitch Bad" did not enter the Billboard Hot 100, but peaked at number 11 on the Bubbling Under Hot 100 Singles chart, which acts as a 25-song extension to the Hot 100. It did not enter the Hot R&B/Hip-Hop Songs chart, but peaked at number 16 on the Bubbling Under R&B/Hip-Hop Singles chart, which acts as a 25-song extension to the Hot R&B/Hip-Hop Songs chart.
C  "This City" did not enter the Billboard Hot 100, but peaked at number 2 on the Bubbling Under Hot 100 Singles chart, which acts as a 25-song extension to the Hot 100.
D  "I'm Beamin did not enter the Billboard Hot 100, but peaked at number 18 on the Bubbling Under Hot 100 Singles chart, which acts as a 25-song extension to the Hot 100.
E  "Letting Go" did not enter the Billboard Hot 100, but peaked at number 6 on the Bubbling Under Hot 100 Singles chart, which acts as a 25-song extension to the Hot 100.
F  "Till I Get There" did not enter the Billboard Hot 100, but peaked at number 10 on the Bubbling Under Hot 100 Singles chart, which acts as a 25-song extension to the Hot 100.
G  "I Don't Wanna Care Right Now" did not enter the Billboard Hot 100, but peaked at number 12 on the Bubbling Under Hot 100 Singles chart, which acts as a 25-song extension to the Hot 100.
H  Drogas Wave did not enter the ARIA Albums Chart, but peaked at number 43 on the ARIA Digital Albums Chart.

References

External links

Hip hop discographies
Discographies of American artists